Boro surname is used by Boro people. Boro means great people. Bodo, Baro and Bara are other variants of Boro. Boro is derived from Baraha or varaha, the third incarnation of Lord Vishnu. Boros are regarded as offspring of Varaha and his consort Basumati . Basumatary is the largest clan of Boro people.

Notable people 
 Jamuna Boro
 Durga Boro
 Ankushita Boro

References

Bibliography

 

Surnames of Indian origin
Bodo-language surnames